Miss Continente Americano 2006, the very first Miss Continente Americano pageant, was held in Guayaquil, Ecuador on August 28, 2006. Mía Taveras from the Dominican Republic was crowned as the very first Miss American Continent by First Lady María Beatriz Paret de Palacio.

Results

Placements

Special awards

Contestants

Notes

Crossovers
Contestants who also competed in Miss World 2005:
 - Melissa Piedrahita
Contestants who also competed in Miss Universe 2006:
 - Fabriella Quesada
 - Catalina López
 -Mía Taveras
 - Rebecca Iraheta
 - Cristiana Frixione
 - Fatimih Dávila
Contestants who also competed in Miss International 2006:
 - Lissy Salguero
 - Lissa Viera Sáenz
Contestants who also competed in Miss Earth 2006:
 - Caroline Neff
Contestants who also competed in Miss Atlantico Internacional 2007:
 - Soraya Bohl (Winner)
Contestants who also competed in Miss International 2008:
 - Dayana Colmenares (Top 12)
Contestants who also competed in Miss World 2008:
 - Fatimih Dávila

References

External links
 Miss Continente Americano Official Website

Miss Continente Americano
2006 beauty pageants
Beauty pageants in Ecuador